Euphrates River is the sixth album by American singing group  The Main Ingredient. Released in 1974, the album charted at number 8 on the Soul albums chart in the U.S.

Release history

In addition to the standard 2 channel stereo version, the album was also released in a 4 channel quadraphonic version in 1976. The quad LP was encoded using the Compatible Discrete 4 system.

This album was reissued in the UK on the Super Audio CD format in 2016 by Dutton Vocalion. The release contains both the stereo and quad mixes.

Track listing

Charts

Singles

References

External links
 

1974 albums
The Main Ingredient (band) albums
RCA Records albums